Michael Lenere Jones (born November 10, 1966) is a former American football player. A native of Bridgeport, Connecticut, Jones was a three-sport star and high school all-American amassing several state championships for Warren Harding High School.  He attended the University of Michigan on a football and baseball scholarship. While at Harding he played football, basketball and baseball winning 9 total state championships and was a high school All-American in all three sports. He was a 4 time all state basketball, football and 2 time baseball player.

He had a tryout and was offered a contract for the NY Yankees but ultimately chose football and college. He played college football for the 1985 Michigan Wolverines football team as a backup quarterback behind Jim Harbaugh.  With Harbaugh securely entrenched in the starting quarterback spot at Michigan, Jones transferred to a junior college after one year at Michigan, he stayed there for only one season so that he wouldn't lose eligibility.  He later played college football at the tight end position for the Texas A&M Aggies football team from 1988 to 1989 where he obtained All- American honors.

He played professional football as a tight end for the Minnesota Vikings from 1990 to 1991 and for the Seattle Seahawks in 1992. Also playing for the Indianapolis Colts. Jones has recently served as an advanced scout and assistant coach for the Minnesota Vikings as well as New England Patriots and Philadelphia Eagles. 

Jones is also a member of Omega Psi Phi.

References

1966 births
Living people
American football tight ends
Michigan Wolverines football players
Texas A&M Aggies football players
Minnesota Vikings players
Seattle Seahawks players
Indianapolis Colts players
Sportspeople from Bridgeport, Connecticut
Players of American football from Connecticut
Warren Harding High School alumni